Mizgin Ay (born 22 June 2000) is a Kurdish track and field athlete who competes in the 100 m, 200 m and 400 m events for Turkey.

Early years
Mizgin Ay was born in Batman, southeastern Turkey on 22 June 2000.

She started with running already in the primary school years. At age ten, her talent in short-distance running was discovered. Two years later, she participated in athletics competitions. In 2014, she became the holder of six gold medals, winning all the competitions she took part in. At age 16, she joined Fenerbahçe Athletics.

Career
Ay won the gold medal in the 100 m and the bronze medal in the 200 m event at the 2017 World Youth Championships in Athletics in Nairobi, Kenya. At the 2017 Islamic Solidarity Games in Baku, Azerbaijan, she won the bronze medal in the 100 m, and another bronze medal in the 4 x 400 m event.

In 2018, she took the gold medal in the 
60 m event of the 23rd Balkan Athletics Indoor Championships inIstanbul, Turkey. With her time of 7.38, she set a new national record for U20.

She won the gold medal in the 100 m event at the International Sprint and Relay Cup in Erzurum, Turkey in 2019.

In 2020, she took the silver medal in the 60 m event at the 25th Balkan Indoor Athletics Championships in Istanbul, Turkey.

Personal bests

Competition record

References

External links

2000 births
Living people
Sportspeople from Batman, Turkey
Turkish female sprinters
European Games competitors for Turkey
Athletes (track and field) at the 2019 European Games
World Youth Championships in Athletics winners
Fenerbahçe athletes
21st-century Turkish sportswomen